Mediacorp has given Star Awards to actors and actresses for their performances in drama serials since its inception. Throughout the history of the Star Awards, there have been actors and actresses who have received multiple Star Awards for Best Actor, Best Actress, Best Supporting Actor, or Best Supporting Actress.

, 23 actors and actresses have received two or more Star Awards in acting categories. Chen Hanwei leads the way with nine awards (seven Best Actor awards and two Best Supporting Actor awards), while Xie Shaoguang has won seven awards (five Best Actor awards and two Best Supporting Actor awards). Huang Biren, Xiang Yun, and Zoe Tay remain as the most-awarded female actresses, with four wins each. Xie was the first to receive four awards in 1998, followed by Xiang Yun in 2009, and most recently Chen in 2010. Xie was also the first to receive five, six, and seven awards in 1999, 2003 and 2004 respectively, followed by Chen in 2015, 2017, and 2018. Chen became the first actor to receive eight and nine awards in 2019 and in 2022 respectively.

References

External links

Star Awards